BGX is the IATA code of the Comandante Gustavo Kraemer Airport of Bagé, Brazil.

bgx is the ISO 639 language code for Balkan Gagauz Turkish.